is a cyberpunk visual novel role-playing video game for the Sega Mega-CD adapted from the Japanese version of the pen and paper RPG Shadowrun by FASA (which was created by Group SNE). It was developed by Japanese company Compile and released on February 23, 1996 in Japan only as both the last Mega-CD game released in Japan and the last game released anywhere on the Mega-CD/Sega CD.

The game has a 1990s manga-based visual style loosely based on a contemporary Japanese manga series which was based on the Shadowrun franchise. Unlike the other Shadowrun video games which are set in Seattle and surrounding areas, this game is set entirely in Japan. In the fictional Shadowrun setting, Japan maintains a practice of exiling all orcs and trolls; thus there are no characters of those races in this game. The combat system is turn-based, and six-sided dice appear rolling on the screen determine the results of combat—the conflict resolution system used in the Shadowrun table-top game.

Reception
The game was scored a 24/40 by Famitsu.

References

External links
 

1996 video games
1990s interactive fiction
Adventure games
Japan-exclusive video games
Role-playing video games
Sega CD games
Sega CD-only games
Shadowrun video games
Video games developed in Japan
Visual novels
Cyberpunk video games